Leonard Franklin Hilty (September 5, 1896 – January 9, 1978) was an American football player.  He played college football for the University of Pittsburgh and was a consensus selection at the tackle position on the 1918 College Football All-America Team.

Hilty was raised in Pittsburgh, Pennsylvania, and attended Peabody High School.  He enrolled at the University of Pittsburgh where he was a member of the Sigma Alpha Epsilon fraternity. He was also a member of the Pittsburgh Panthers football team and was selected as a consensus first-team All-American in 1918. 

After graduating from Pitt, Hilty moved to Houston, Texas, by 1920.  He lived there with his wife, a Texas native, and their two children.  He was employed for many years as a salesman for a paper company, L.S. Bosworth Co.  Hilty died in 1978 at Brenham, Texas, at age 81.

References

1896 births
1978 deaths
American football tackles
Pittsburgh Panthers football players
All-American college football players
Players of American football from Pittsburgh